Gabès riots was a three-day wave of anti-Jewish violence which erupted in the Tunisian city of Gabès in 1941. It was the worst outbreak of violence against Jews in North Africa during World War II.

History
The riots began when a mob of Arabs rushed the Jewish Quarter, killing 7 Jews and injuring 20.

Along with the 7 Jews initially murdered, one policemen was also killed.

Eyewitness Accounts
A Jew from Gabès, Tzvi Hadadd, remembered his mother rushing outside to look for his sister, only to be assaulted as she stepped out the front door. He recalled:

Bibliography
 Abramski-Bligh Irit, Drevon Claire, « L’influence de la Seconde Guerre mondiale sur les relations judéo-arabes en Libye et en Tunisie », Revue d’Histoire de la Shoah, 2016/2 (N° 205), p. 317-353. DOI : 10.3917/rhsho.205.0317. URL : https://www.cairn.info/revue-revue-d-histoire-de-la-shoah-2016-2-page-317.htm

See also
Farhud
Antisemitism in the Arab world
Islam and antisemitism

References

1941 in Tunisia
1941 riots
Anti-Jewish pogroms by Muslims 1941-49
Antisemitism in Tunisia
Conflicts in 1941
Jewish Tunisian history
May 1941 events
1941 in Judaism
Massacres in 1941